Rahayta, also spelled Rahaita or Raheita, is a town in the Southern Red Sea region of Eritrea and was once the residence of a former sultanate.

References
Rahayta, Eritrea

Populated places in Eritrea